Symphylurinus is a genus of diplurans in the family Projapygidae.

Species
 Symphylurinus almedai Wygodzinsky, 1946
 Symphylurinus antenofloridus San Martín, 1964
 Symphylurinus arlei Wygodzinsky, 1941
 Symphylurinus blanguernoni Pagés, 1951
 Symphylurinus carbonelli Mañé-Garzon & San Martín, 1960
 Symphylurinus cuelloi San Martín, 1962
 Symphylurinus dhiralankara Fernando, 1959
 Symphylurinus discretus Silvestri, 1938
 Symphylurinus fuquesi San Martín, 1967
 Symphylurinus grassi Silvestri, 1909
 Symphylurinus indicus Silvestri, 1937
 Symphylurinus kelanitissa Fernando, 1959
 Symphylurinus klappenbachi San Martín, 1962
 Symphylurinus legrandi Mañé-Garzon & San Martín, 1960
 Symphylurinus lutzi Silvestri, 1937
 Symphylurinus marcuzzii Pagés, 1955
 Symphylurinus monnei San Martín, 1966
 Symphylurinus monoglandularis San Martín & Sandulski, 1963
 Symphylurinus occidentalis Silvestri, 1938
 Symphylurinus orientalis Silvestri, 1937
 Symphylurinus palermi San Martín, 1967
 Symphylurinus paratus Silvestri, 1938
 Symphylurinus perceptus Silvestri, 1938
 Symphylurinus peregrinus Silvestri, 1938
 Symphylurinus remyi Pagés, 1953
 Symphylurinus simplex Silvestri, 1938
 Symphylurinus spinidentatus San Martín, 1966
 Symphylurinus strangei Smith, 1960
 Symphylurinus swani Womersley, 1945
 Symphylurinus travassosi Silvestri, 1938
 Symphylurinus tristani Silvestri, 1938

References

Diplura